RJP may refer to

 Rashtriya Janahita Party, political party in India
 Rastriya Janashakti Party, political party in Nepal
 Realistic job preview
 Polish Language Council, Rada Języka Polskiego
 Remote Job Processing, IBM Remote job entry in ASP and JES3